Zambry bin Abdul Kadir (born 22 March 1962) is a Malaysian politician who has served as the Minister of Foreign Affairs in the Pakatan Harapan (PH) administration under Prime Minister Anwar Ibrahim and Senator since December 2022. He served as the 11th Menteri Besar of Perak from February 2009 to the collapse of the Barisan Nasional (BN) state administration in May 2018 and Member of the Perak State Executive Council (EXCO) in the BN state administration under former Menteri Besar Tajol Rosli Mohd Ghazali from March 2004 to another collapse of the BN state administration in March 2008 and Member of the Perak State Legislative Assembly (MLA) for Pangkor from March 2004 to November 2022. He is a member of the United Malays National Organisation (UMNO), a component party of the federal ruling BN coalition. He has also served as the Secretary-General of BN since June 2021.

Personal life
Zambry was born on 22 March 1963 in Pulau Pangkor, a tourist fisherman's settlement island in the state of Perak, Malaysia. He was appointed as the Chief Minister on 6 February 2009. He is the 11th Chief Minister for the state.

He is married to Saripah Zulkifli and parents to three girls and two boys—Husna, Huda, Syifa, Munir and the youngest Mukhlis.

Education
Zambry obtained his early education in Pangkor Island and secondary schools in Sitiawan (SMK Sitiawan) before continuing his upper secondary education at Sekolah Menengah Kebangsaan Panglima Bukit Gantang, Parit Buntar, Perak, a high school located in the mainland.

He holds a PhD in Political Thoughts with distinction from the Temple University Philadelphia, Pennsylvania, United States (1995), after completing his master's degree in Political Philosophy and Comparative Religion from the same university in 1993.

The Perak 11th Chief Minister also holds another master's degree in Islamic Thoughts from the International Islamic University Malaysia in 1991, after completing his first degree, B.Econ (Hon) in Economics from the same institution. Zambry recently attended a two-week Executive Leadership Development Programme entitled "Leaders in Development – Managing Change in a Dynamic World", at Harvard University, USA (June 2015).

Political career
Zambry became actively involved in politics in 1995, soon after his return from the United States.

He started his political journey in UMNO as the Pangkor UMNO Branch Chief before being elected as Lumut UMNO Youth Division Chief. He later won a seat as the executive council member at the National UMNO Youth before being appointed as the State UMNO Youth Chief.

In the 2004 General Election, he stood and won the Perak State Legislative Assembly seat for Pangkor and returned as incumbent in 2008 and 2013 General Election. He is holding the seat as a Pangkor State Assemblyman for the third term and second term as the Chief Minister of Perak.

Zambry is the head of Perak UMNO and Lumut UMNO division chief. He also had his share of political bitterness when he was detained under the Internal Security Act (ISA) in 1998.

Perak Constitutional Crisis
A member of the Perak state legislative assembly, Zambry a key player in the 2009 Perak constitutional crisis as the intended BN Menteri Besar. After three state assemblypersons from the Pakatan Rakyat coalition announced their intention to support a BN candidate for Menteri Besar, and to lend their support to a vote of no confidence in the incumbent Pakatan Rakyat Menteri Besar Mohammad Nizar Jamaluddin, Sultan Azlan Shah of Perak requested Nizar's resignation and swore in Zambry as the new Menteri Besar on 6 February 2009. Zambry acted as Menteri Besar for about three months. However, Nizar maintained that the Sultan was not permitted by the state constitution to dismiss him as the Menteri Besar, and on 11 May 2009, the Kuala Lumpur High Court ruled that Nizar had always been the rightful Menteri Besar of Perak. To maintain administrative continuity, Nizar tentatively endorsed most of Zambry's policies, subject to later review, but reinstated the 817 village development and security committees and 318 local government councillors whom Zambry had sacked. However, the following day, the Court of Appeal granted a stay of the High Court judgment, and Zambry returned to work.

On May, 22nd, the Court of Appeal in a unanimous decision, declared Datuk Seri Dr Zambry Abdul Kadir as the rightful menteri besar of Perak. The court held that the order made by the High Court on 11 May, in declaring Datuk Seri Mohammad Nizar Jamaluddin as the legitimate menteri besar, was wrong and set aside that decision. Justice Md Raus, in his oral judgement, also held that the Sultan of Perak, Sultan Azlan Shah, was right in appointing Zambry as the new menteri besar, under Article 16(2) of the Perak Constitution, after being satisfied that Zambry had the command of the majority of the state legislative assembly.

Writings

Zambry has written essays for local media and publications Utusan Malaysia, Berita Harian, Dewan Masyarakat, Dewan Budaya, Dakwah, Risalah, Al-Islam, Mastika, and PEMIKIR, besides books and journals.

Among the books he wrote were UMNO dan Jiwa Merdeka (CELDES KL 1998), Pemuda UMNO Menebus Maruah, Menuju Arah (May, 2000) and Islam Malaysia & Amerika. His poems were compiled in an anthology in a book entitled Suara Pelaut (The Voice of a Seaman).

He has also produced numerous academic papers in magazines and journals, Politics In Malaysia, A Changing Scenario (2000), Belia dan Cabaran Politik Pascakolonial (1999) and he is also a contributor to Encyclopedia of Malaysiana (1998).

Zambry edited publications on Education and Development for Nurin Enterprise, K.L (1980), served as the Editor for Business Administration in Islam, Hizbi (1991), editor for Memperkasa Kepimpinan Merentas Masa Depan, CELDES, KL (1991). He was also the Editorial Chief for Imbas Gemilang KBS 1998, a publication for  the Ministry of Youth and Sports.

Among his translation works are Faces of Islam (Berita Publishing, 1990), Qur'anic Sciences (Dewan Bahasa dan Pustaka, 1991) and Islamic Legal Philosophy (Dewan Bahasa dan Pustaka, Oktober, 2000).

Awards and recognitions
Zambry received the (GIFA 2014) in Dubai, United Arab Emirates. The special award was presented to him as an exemplary leader in eradicating poverty in the state by setting up Yayasan Bina Upaya Darul Ridzuan (YBUDR). GIFA is an award in the Islamic finance services industry.

Election results

Honours
  :
  Knight Commander of the Order of the Perak State Crown (DPMP) – Dato' (2002)
  Knight Grand Commander of the Order of the Perak State Crown (SPMP) – Dato' Seri (2009)
  Ordinary Class of the Perak Family Order of Sultan Azlan Shah (SPSA) – Dato' Seri DiRaja (2011)
  :
  Grand Commander of the Exalted Order of Malacca (DGSM) – Datuk Seri (2009)

References

1963 births
Living people
Malaysian people of Malay descent
People from Perak
Malaysian people of Indian descent
Malaysian Muslims
United Malays National Organisation politicians
Chief Ministers of Perak
Members of the Perak State Legislative Assembly
Perak state executive councillors
International Islamic University Malaysia alumni
Temple University alumni
21st-century Malaysian politicians